Stephen Francis Smith (born 12 December 1955) is the current High Commissioner of Australia to the United Kingdom and formerly an Australian politician who was a member of the House of Representatives for Perth from 1993 to 2013, representing the Australian Labor Party. He served as a minister in the Rudd and Gillard Governments, including as Minister for Foreign Affairs (2007–2010), Minister for Trade (2010), and Minister for Defence (2010–2013).

Early life
Smith was born in Narrogin, Western Australia, and was educated at CBC Highgate, the University of Western Australia and the University of London, where he earned a master's degree in law. He was a solicitor, lecturer and tutor before entering politics. He was Principal Private Secretary to the Western Australian Attorney-General, Joe Berinson 1983–87 and State Secretary of the Western Australian Labor Party 1987–90. From 1990 to 1993 he was an adviser to Paul Keating, first when Keating was Treasurer, then when Keating was Prime Minister. He was instrumental in securing caucus support in order for Keating to defeat Bob Hawke for the Labor Party leadership in 1991 and thereby allowing Keating to ascend to the prime ministership.

Career
Smith was a member of the Opposition Shadow Ministry from March 1996 until the November 2007 elections, which were won by the Labor party. He was Shadow Minister for Trade 1996–97, for Resources and Energy 1997–98, for Communications 1998–2001, Health and Ageing 2001–03 and Immigration 2003–04. He was Shadow Minister for Industry, Infrastructure and Industrial Relations from October 2004 until December 2006, when he was appointed to the position of Shadow Minister for Education and Training.

During the leadership crisis in the Labor Party in 2003, Smith was a prominent supporter of his fellow Western Australian, Kim Beazley. As early as 2002 his name had been mentioned as a possible future leader. He again supported Beazley in the leadership contest which followed the resignation of Mark Latham in January 2005, which saw Beazley return to the leadership.

Smith was appointed Minister for Foreign Affairs in Kevin Rudd's cabinet on 3 December following Labor's win in the 2007 election, and when Julia Gillard took over from Kevin Rudd as prime minister in June 2010, she added Minister for Trade to Smith's portfolio. After the 2010 federal election Smith was appointed to the vacant Defence portfolio, while Rudd and Craig Emerson were appointed to the Foreign Affairs and Trade ministries, respectively.

Following Kevin Rudd's return to the leadership of the ALP and as prime minister, on 27 June 2013 Smith announced he would not be a candidate at the 2013 federal election.

Post-parliamentary career
Smith was appointed Winthrop Professor of International Law at the University of Western Australia on 29 April 2014.

In March 2016, Smith announced that he did not believe the leader of the Labor Party in Western Australia, Mark McGowan, was capable of leading the party to victory at the 2017 state election. He sought to enter the Western Australian Legislative Assembly by seeking preselection in the new seat of Baldivis. His bid for preselection was unsuccessful.

Smith was appointed Chairman of ASX listed Canberra-based cyber security firm archTIS in March 2018. 

In August 2022, Smith was appointed to co-lead the Defence Strategic Review into the Australian Defence Force by Prime Minister Anthony Albanese. On 30 September 2022, Smith was named as the next High Commissioner of Australia to the United Kingdom, to take up office on 26 January 2023 following the completion of the Defence Strategic Review.

Photo gallery

See also
 First Rudd Ministry
 First Gillard Ministry
 Second Gillard Ministry
 Second Rudd Ministry

References

Further reading
 ParlInfo - Biography for SMITH, the Hon. Stephen Francis, Parliament of Australia.
 Stephen Smith – biographical information, appointed senior adviser to Paul Keating Labor voice, Vol.12, no.4 (Dec 1990), p. 1–2.
 Stephen Smith – former W.A. A.L.P. state secretary moves to Paul Keating's staff Australian Business, 5 December 1990, p. 30

External links

1955 births
Alumni of the University of London
Australian Labor Party members of the Parliament of Australia
Labor Right politicians
Australian ministers for Foreign Affairs
Australian solicitors
Gillard Government
Government ministers of Australia
Living people
Members of the Australian House of Representatives for Perth
Members of the Cabinet of Australia
People from Narrogin, Western Australia
Rudd Government
University of Western Australia alumni
Defence ministers of Australia
21st-century Australian politicians
20th-century Australian politicians